Tonowas (or Tonoas), also known by its Spanish name of Dublon, is an island in the Chuuk (formerly Truk) lagoon, Federated States of Micronesia. It has an area of 8.8 km2 and the population was 3,200 at the time of the last census (1980). A narrow single-lane track rings the island, allowing land access to the small villages (Nechap, Kuchua, Sangku, Enin, Yongku and the island of Etten) Five schools and Japanese military ruins, which include the remains of a seaplane anchorage and large fuel storage tanks. A Japanese administrative center dating from the 1920-1930s mandate period can still be found, and is currently used as a government building.

Dublon was a headquarters for the Imperial Japanese Army (IJA) during the Second World War. The Japanese name for the island was Natsu Shima (or Natsushima), which means "Summer Island." An underground bunker housing the IJA's headquarters facilities is listed on the United States National Register of Historic Places.

External links 
 Directory of the islands of Micronesia

Islands of Chuuk State
Municipalities of Chuuk State